Shapira is a surname, and may refer to:

 Amitzur Shapira, Israeli runner and track and field coach killed in the 1972 Munich massacre
 Amos Shapira, Israeli former President of El Al Airlines, Cellcom, and the University of Haifa
 Anita Shapira, Israeli historian
 Avraham Shapira, rabbi 
 Benjamin Shapira, Israeli biochemist
 Berechiah Berak ben Isaac Eisik Shapira, 17th-century rabbi
 Dan Shapira, American physicist
 David Shapira, American businessman
 Haim-Moshe Shapira, Israeli politician
 Isaiah Meïr Kahana Shapira (1828–1887), Polish-German rabbi and author
 Moshe Shmuel Shapira, rabbi
 Moses Wilhelm Shapira
 Nimrod Shapira Bar-Or (born 1989), Israeli swimmer
 Omer Shapira (born 1994), Israeli racing cyclist
 Rachel Shapira, Israeli songwriter and poet
 Yitzhak Shapira, author of The King's Torah
 Yosef Shapira, Israeli judge and State Comptroller of Israel
 Shapira (Tel Aviv neighborhood)

See also 
 Shapiro
 Shakira

Jewish surnames
Yiddish-language surnames